Roman Meluzín (born 17 June 1972) is a Czech former professional ice hockey player who played with HC Slovan Bratislava in the Slovak Extraliga.

Previously he played for HC Zlín, Tappara Tampere, HC Oceláři Třinec and HC Kometa Brno.

References

External links 
 

1972 births
Living people
HC Slovan Bratislava players
Czechoslovak ice hockey forwards
Czech ice hockey forwards
HC Kometa Brno players
PSG Berani Zlín players
HC Oceláři Třinec players
People from Blansko
Winnipeg Jets (1979–1996) draft picks
Sportspeople from the South Moravian Region
Czech expatriate ice hockey players in Finland
Czech expatriate ice hockey players in Germany
Czech expatriate ice hockey players in Slovakia